The vice chairman of the Central Military Commission serves as the deputy to the CMC Chairman. Currently, two generals of the People's Liberation Army are serving as vice chairmen: First-ranked vice chairman Zhang Youxia and Second-ranked vice chairman He Weidong.

Party commissions

CCP Central [Revolutionary] Military Commission (1937–49)

CCP Central Military Commission (1959–present)

State commissions

CPG People's Revolutionary Military Commission (1949–54)

PRC National Defense Council (1954–75)

PRC Central Military Commission (1983–present)

See also 

 Central Military Commission (China)
 Chairman of the Central Military Commission

Central Military Commission (China)